James Ryan Jennings (born 2 September 1987) is a former English professional footballer who played as a defender. He is currently Head of Professional Player Support at Stockport County.

Career

Macclesfield Town
Born in Manchester, Jennings joined the senior Macclesfield Town team in May 2006 from Manchester City, making his debut in a 1–0 victory against Walsall in the FA Cup as a 90th-minute substitute on 21 November 2006, this led to Jennings famously playing in Macclesfield Town's 3rd Round FA Cup clash against Chelsea at Stamford Bridge in 2007 His League Two debut came in Macclesfield's first league victory of the 2006–07 as they defeated Rochdale 1–0 in December. He finished the season with 11 appearances, after which he was offered a new contract which he accepted a month later. He signed a new deal with the club until the end of the 2007–08 season in December, and after making two appearances for the team that season he joined Conference National side Altrincham on loan. He made his debut in a 2–1 victory over Northwich Victoria on 1 January 2008 and finished this spell with nine appearances before being recalled by Macclesfield in February. He made a further 20 appearances for Macclesfield after his return and was offered a new contract at the end of the season, which he subsequently signed.

Kettering Town
In the summer of 2009, Jennings left Macclesfield to join Kettering Town. His first appearance for Kettering came in a 2–1 away win over Forest Green Rovers on the opening day of the 2009–10 season. His first goal for the club came in a 2–0 home win against Grays Athletic on 6 March 2010.

Cambridge United
Jennings joined Cambridge United in summer 2010 from Kettering on a two-year deal for an undisclosed fee decided by a tribunal. He made 43 first team starts in his first season with the club. In his second season with The U's, Jennings was named as vice-captain by new manager Jez George. In January 2012, Jennings put pen to paper in a new deal keeping him at the club until the summer of 2014.

Mansfield Town
On the final day of the transfer window, 31 January 2013, Cambridge United allowed Jennings to join Mansfield Town. Jennings signed an 18-month contract with The Stags, with some media outlets mentioning that a fee was involved, with some stating it was a free-transfer. .He was part of the team which won the league with Mansfield in April 2013, gaining promotion to League Two.

Forest Green Rovers
On 3 June 2014, Jennings signed for Forest Green Rovers on a two-year deal. A frustrating start to life at Forest Green saw him suffer an anterior cruciate ligament injury in pre-season training. The injury kept him out of action for eight months, however he returned to make his debut in a 2014–15 Conference National play-off semi-final second leg defeat against Bristol Rovers in front of 10,563 supporters.

He scored his first goal for the club on 22 August 2015 in a 3–1 home win against Lincoln City. He then scored twice in a 2–1 win against Bromley on 31 August 2015 to help Forest Green to a seventh straight win at the start of the 2015–16 National League season. He also scored the equaliser in a game that Forest Green went on to win 3–1 against promotion rivals Dover on 14 November 2015.

After registering a new club record highest league finish of second place, he appeared for Forest Green in the play-offs, going onto make an appearance at Wembley Stadium on 15 May 2016 in a 3–1 loss against Grimsby Town. A day later on 16 May 2016, it was confirmed that he was being released by the club at the end of his two-year contract. His efforts over the season earned him a place in the 2015–16 National League team of the year.

Cheltenham Town
On 26 May 2016 he signed for Cheltenham Town. He scored his first goal for Cheltenham in an EFL Trophy tie against Blackpool on 30 August 2016.
A day later it was announced on deadline day that he had joined Cheltenham's League Two rivals Morecambe on loan until January 2017.

Wrexham
Jennings signed for Wrexham on a loan deal until the end of the 2016–17 season, following in the footsteps of his younger brother Connor who left The Racecourse to join Tranmere the previous season. Following his release from Cheltenham at the end of the season, he resigned with Wrexham on a 2-year deal on 23 May.

Stockport County
Following his release from Wrexham, Jennings joined Stockport County on 16 July 2020.

On 5 August 2021, Jennings announced his retirement from football following knee surgery and advice from a knee consultant.

Coaching Career
In July 2022, Jennings was appointed to the newly created role of Head of Professional Player Support at Stockport County having continued to be involved at the club since his retirement twelve months prior.

Personal life
James's younger brother is Connor Jennings who also plays for Stockport County but is a striker

Career statistics

Honours
Individual
National League Team of the Year: 2015–16

References

External links

1987 births
Living people
Footballers from Manchester
English footballers
Association football defenders
Macclesfield Town F.C. players
Altrincham F.C. players
Kettering Town F.C. players
Cambridge United F.C. players
Mansfield Town F.C. players
Forest Green Rovers F.C. players
Cheltenham Town F.C. players
Morecambe F.C. players
Wrexham A.F.C. players
Stockport County F.C. players
English Football League players
National League (English football) players
Stockport County F.C. non-playing staff